

Regular season
The 1948 season was the Phillies' 16th consecutive losing season. It was the major league record until the Pittsburgh Pirates broke it in 2009 with their 17th consecutive losing season.

Season standings

Record vs. opponents

Notable transactions
 April 7, 1948: Ralph LaPointe and $30,000 were traded by the Phillies to the St. Louis Cardinals for Dick Sisler.
 April 8, 1948: Phillies purchased the contract of Richie Ashburn from the Toronto Maple Leafs

Roster

Player stats

Batting

Starters by position
Note: Pos = Position; G = Games played; AB = At bats; H = Hits; Avg. = Batting average; HR = Home runs; RBI = Runs batted in

Other batters
Note: G = Games played; AB = At bats; H = Hits; Avg. = Batting average; HR = Home runs; RBI = Runs batted in

Pitching

Starting pitchers 
Note: G = Games pitched; IP = Innings pitched; W = Wins; L = Losses; ERA = Earned run average; SO = Strikeouts

Other pitchers
Note: G = Games pitched; IP = Innings pitched; W = Wins; L = Losses; ERA = Earned run average; SO = Strikeouts

Relief pitchers
Note: G = Games pitched; W = Wins; L = Losses; SV = Saves; ERA = Earned run average; SO = Strikeouts

Farm system

LEAGUE CHAMPIONS: Carbondale

References

External links
1948 Philadelphia Phillies season at Baseball Reference

Philadelphia Phillies seasons
Philadelphia Phillies season
Philadelphia